is a Japanese manga series by Yoshimi Sato. It was serialized in Futabasha's seinen manga magazine Monthly Action from May 2016 to September 2021 and has been collected in eight tankōbon volumes. An anime television series adaptation by Ekachi Epilka aired from April to June 2018.

Plot
Our whole life consists of sheer fuss. People all the time somewhere in a hurry, in a hurry, run ... In the dizzy everyday bustle, sometimes we even have no time to take a breath. But there must be a balance in everything. And if we can not stop in time, the city will do it for us. There are traffic lights on which you can slow down and spend a moment in simple waiting. And there are railway crossings, where you will have to stand a little longer, peering into the distance and looking for the silhouette of an approaching train, and also calculate how many cars there are. What thoughts come to their mind when the barrier suddenly blocks them further? For them, every day is a new story, the sounds of which are mixed with the noise of a train passing along the rails.

This story of short stories tells us about everyday life and the conversations of young people, but at the same time different people on various topics, waiting at railway junctions.

Characters

Media

Manga
Crossing Time is written and illustrated by Yoshimi Sato. It was serialized in Futabasha's Monthly Action magazine from May 25, 2016, to September 25, 2021. The first tankōbon volume was released on December 12, 2016. As of December 2021, eight volumes have been released.

Anime
An anime television series adaptation was announced in the March 2018 issue of Monthly Action, published on January 25, 2018. It is produced by Ekachi Epilka and directed by Yoshio Suzuki, with Misuzu Chiba handling the series' scripts, and Kaori Takamura designing the characters. Yuri Komagata performed the opening theme song "Tomare no Susume". It aired on Tokyo MX from April 10 to June 26, 2018. Crunchyroll licensed the series.

Notes

References

External links
 

Anime series based on manga
Crunchyroll anime
Crunchyroll manga
Ekachi Epilka
Futabasha manga
Seinen manga
Slice of life anime and manga